Shamsuddoha Khan Majlish was an Awami League politician and the former Member of Parliament of Dhaka-12.

Career
Majlish was elected to parliament from Dhaka-12 as an Awami League candidate in 1986.

Personal life
Majlish's wife, Selima Khan Majlish, was murdered on 14 June 2011 in Savar. The case remains unsolved.

References

Jatiya Party politicians
3rd Jatiya Sangsad members